Carlos "Carlitos" Okulovich (born 10 May 1985 in Oberá, Misiones Province) is an Argentine car racing driving.

He has run in different series, with major success and good results in TC2000, Turismo Nacional and Turismo Carretera.

He is the son of Carlos Alberto Okulovich, also a driver.

Driving career 
2001: Argentine Formula Renault Championship (Crespi Juniors)
2002: Argentine Formula Renault Championship (Crespi and Castro Racing Team). 3 poles and 1 win.
Class 2 of Turismo Nacional
2003: Class 2 and 3 of Turismo Nacional
2004: Class 3 of Turismo Nacional (Honda Civic - Alisi), TC2000 (Peugeot 307)
2005: TC2000 (Chevrolet Oficial), Class 3 of Turismo Nacional (Honda Civic - Alisi)
2006: TC2000 (Honda Oficial), Class 3 of Turismo Nacional (Honda Civic - Alisi) and Turismo Carretera (Chevrolet, Emilio Satriano
2007: TC2000 (Honda Oficial)
2008: TC2000 (Honda Oficial), Turismo Carretera (IKA-Renault Torino, Dole Racing), Class 3 of Turismo Nacional (Honda New Civic - Alisi)
2009: Turismo Carretera (IKA-Renault Torino, Dole Racing), Sub-Champion of Class 3 of Turismo Nacional (Honda New Civic - Alisi)
2010: Turismo Carretera (Chevrolet Chevy, Arana Inenieria Sport), Champion Class 3 of Turismo Nacional (Honda New Civic) 
 2011: Turismo Carretera (Torino, Maquin Parts), Clase 3 del Turismo Nacional (Honda Civic VIII - Alisi)
 2012: Turismo Carretera (Dodge, Catalán Magni Motorsport, Clase 3 del Turismo Nacional (Renault Sport Team Oficial Fluence - Alisi)
 2012: Turismo Carretera (Torino, Maquin Parts), Turismo Nacional Clase 3 (Renault Sport Team Oficial Fluence - Alisi)
 2013: Turismo Carretera (Torino, Maquin Parts), Turismo Nacional Clase 3 (Renault Sport Team Oficial Fluence - Alisi)
 2013: Turismo Carretera (Torino, Maquin Parts)
 2014: Turismo Carretera (Torino, Maquin Parts)
 2015: Turismo Carretera (Torino, Maquin Parts)
 2016: Turismo Nacional Clase 3 (Ford Focus)
 2017: Turismo Carretera (Torino Cherokee, Maquin Parts Racing, Turismo Nacional Clase 3 (Ford Focus, Martos Competición
 2018: Turismo Carretera (Torino Cherokee, Maquin Parts Racing, Turismo Nacional Clase 3 (Ford Focus, Martos Competición

References

External links 

Carlos Okulovich's Official Website 

1985 births
Living people
People from Oberá
Argentine racing drivers
TC 2000 Championship drivers
Turismo Carretera drivers
Top Race V6 drivers
Formula Renault Argentina drivers
Sportspeople from Misiones Province